New York's 36th State Assembly district is one of the 150 districts in the New York State Assembly. It has been represented by Zohran Mamdani since 2021, after he defeated Aravella Simotas in the Democratic primary.

Geography
District 36 is located in Queens. It encompasses Astoria, and its neighborhoods, Ditmars and Astoria Heights.

Recent election results

2022

2020

2018

2016

2014

2012

2010

2008

References

35